Taiwanfest, stylized TAIWANfest, formerly known as the Taiwanese Composers Music Festival, is an annual cultural festival held in Vancouver and Toronto. The original focus of TAIWANfest was to celebrate Taiwanese culture, however, in recent years, the festival expanded to include dialogues with local Canadian communities including Indigenous communities, Asian-Canadian communities, and other Asian cultures. It is reported to be the largest English/Mandarin bilingual cultural festival in Canada.

History 
In 1990, Chen Huizhong of Vancouver Formosa Academy hosted the "Night of Taiwanese Composers Music Concert," which included a performance by renowned musician Tyzen Hsiao. In 1991, Vancouver Formosa Academy held the "Taiwanese Composers Piano Concert," which introduced and shared Taiwanese culture to Canadians. In the same year, the Taiwanese Canadian Cultural Society was established. In 1992, the Taiwanese Canadian Cultural Society and Vancouver Formosa Academy together hosted the "Indoor Taiwanese Composers Music Concert." In 1994, the event was expanded into a cultural festival, which included three concerts, a film exhibition, live lectures, and cultural seminars. To accommodate the changes, the festival was renamed once again as "TAIWANfest," though the focus of the event remained on the live concert. As TAIWANfest continued to expand, in 2004, the Taiwanese Canadian Cultural Society established the Taiwanese Canadian Special Events Association to work on organizing the event. In 2009, the Asian Canadian Special Events Association (formerly known as the Taiwanese Canadian Special Events Association) was given full authority to host TAIWANfest.

Dialogues with Asia Timeline (2016 onwards)

References

External links 
 TAIWANfest Vancouver
 TAIWANfest Toronto

Cultural festivals in Canada
Taiwanese Canadian
1990 establishments in British Columbia
Festivals established in 1990